Jaroslava Schallerová (born 25 April 1956), sometimes credited as Jarka Shallerová, is a Czech former actress who emerged during the 1970s. Her acting debut was at the age of 13 in the Czech New Wave film Valerie and Her Week of Wonders. Her film career spanned the 1970s and continued intermittently into the 1990s.

Filmography
 Valerie a týden divů (1970) .... Valerie
 Szép lányok, ne sírjatok! (1970) .... Juli 
 Égi bárány (1970) .... A fiatal anya 
 Hangyaboly (1971) .... Gruber Helénke
 Végre, hétfö! (1971) (as Jarka Schallerova) .... Pincérlány
 Homolka a Tobolka (1972) 
 My, ztracený holky (1972)
 Zlá noc (1973)
 Láska (1973) .... Andrea Vasáková 
 Die Elixiere des Teufels (1973)
 Malá mořská víla (1975) 
 Zaklęte rewiry (1975) .... Zoska
 Der Hasenhüter (1976) (TV) .... Prinzessin Adelheid/Anne 
 Do posledného dychu (1976) 
 30 panen a Pythagoras (1977) .... Helena Trojanová
 Píseň o stromu a růži (1978) .... Vera Havlová 
 Kočičí princ (1978) 
 Die Gänsehirtin am Brunnen (1979)
 Útěky domů (1980) 
 Křeček v noční košili (1987) TV Series
 Uf-oni jsou tady'' (1990) .... Jirka's mother

External links
 
 CFN (in Czech)
 Doteky Jaroslavy Schallerové in Czech

Czech film actresses
1956 births
Living people
Place of birth missing (living people)